Propuesta y control was an Argentine magazine established in 1976 by Raúl Alfonsín and Yuyo Roulet. Although Alfonsín was a prominent leader of the Radical Civic Union, the magazine featured editorials from people unrelated to the party. The magazine was directed by Alfonsin in two periods: from August 1976 to October 1978 and from March 1990 to December 1992.

References

1976 establishments in Argentina
1992 disestablishments in Argentina
Defunct magazines published in Argentina
Defunct political magazines
Magazines established in 1976
Magazines disestablished in 1992
Spanish-language magazines
Political magazines published in Argentina